HSC-7 Helicopter Sea Combat Squadron Seven, also known as the Dusty Dogs, is a United States Navy helicopter squadron located at Naval Station Norfolk. They are attached to Carrier Air Wing Three and deploy aboard .

History
HSC-7 traces its lineage to the second of two squadrons which have borne the designation Helicopter Antisubmarine Squadron SEVEN (HS-7). That Squadron which has become HSC-7 was established on December 15, 1969.

1956–1966
The first squadron designated HS-7 was established on April 2, 1956 at Naval Air Station Norfolk, Virginia for the purpose of harbor defense. The squadron was known as the "Big Dippers" and flew the HSS-1 Seabat. By 1960 the squadron had been assigned the role of Antisubmarine Warfare in support of fleet ships. The squadron deployed aboard  flying the autopilot equipped HSS-1N Seabat giving it the ability to operate at night and in marginal weather. in September 1962 the squadron's helicopters were re-designated the SH-34J Seabat in compliance with the 1962 United States Tri-Service aircraft designation system. From at least January 1965 (and probably before that), until it was disestablished on May 31, 1966, it was deployed aboard , used Sikorsky SH-3A Sea King helicopters, and was known as "The Big Dippers."

1969–1980
On December 15, 1969, the second squadron designated HS-7 and the squadron which has become HSC-7 was established at NAS Quonset Point, Rhode Island. It was equipped with the Sikorsky SH-3D Sea King and it adopted the name "Big Dippers" in honor of the previous HS-7. During a respite between cruises in 1970–71, the squadron held a naming contest, resulting in the "Big Dippers" becoming the 'Shamrocks'.

The 'Shamrocks' deployed her next cruise with CVW-3 (AC) and USS Saratoga, HS-7 commanded by Commander H. Price. The cruise from 6 January to 28 July 1976, took place in the Mediterranean Sea, with port visits to Rota, Malaga, and Palma de Mallorca, Spain, Taranto, and Naples, Italy, Split, Croatia, Cannes, France, Genoa, Italy, Monaco, and Barcelona, Spain

1980–2000

In 1994, HS-7 became the first HS squadron on the east coast to be assigned female sailors and officers. In September 1994, HS-7 was tasked to support Dwight D. Eisenhower which had embarked the US Army's 10th Mountain Division off the coast of Haiti during Operation UPHOLD DEMOCRACY. Later that same year, HS-7 deployed to the Persian Gulf in support of Operation SOUTHERN WATCH and to the Adriatic Sea during Operations DENY FLIGHT and PROVIDE PROMISE.

Upon returning from Dwight D. Eisenhower in 1995, the 'Dusty Dogs' transitioned to the Sikorsky SH-60F and HH-60H helicopters.

2000–2010
Departing in late 2000, attached to Carrier Air Wing Three (CVW-3) the wing completed the maiden cruise of  returning in June 2001. From December 2002 to April 2005, HS-7 deployed twice more onboard Harry S. Truman. During the 2003 cruise, the ship and airwing served in the Mediterranean and Adriatic Seas in support of Operations NORTHERN WATCH and IRAQI FREEDOM. In September 2005, HS-7 embarked in Harry S. Truman, went to the Gulf of Mexico in support of Hurricane Katrina relief efforts. From November 2007 to June 2008, the Dusty Dogs again deployed aboard TRUMAN with CVW-3 in support of Operations IRAQI FREEDOM and ENDURING FREEDOM. From June 2008 to May 2010 the Dusty Dogs met the challenges of an extended workup cycle, which included eight at-sea periods, two air wing trips to NAS Fallon, and four detachments to the Atlantic Undersea Test and Evaluation Center (AUTEC).

2010 onwards

In May 2010, HS-7, attached to CVW-3, departed aboard USS Harry S. Truman for a seven-month deployment to the 5th Fleet AOR. The Dusty Dogs supported CSG-10 assets participating in Operations ENDURING FREEDOM and NEW DAWN while providing the Strike Group with essential anti-terrorism force protection, logistic, MEDEVAC, and SAR support. Cruise highlights include the night rescue of eight Iranian mariners in the North Arabian Sea and joint rotary-wing training with the Royal Air Force of Oman – a first in the history of the U.S. Naval helicopter aviation. In November 2010, after 54 years of excellence in Anti-submarine warfare, HS-7 sundowned their ASW mission when they went "ball dry" for the last time.

On April 15, 2011, Helicopter Antisubmarine Squadron SEVEN was re-designated Helicopter Sea Combat Squadron SEVEN (HSC-7). From there the squadron moved to Norfolk, Virginia, and successfully completed their transition to the MH-60S. At the end of 2012, HSC-7 began the first of their deployment workups in the MH-60S.
 
From July 2013 to April 2014, HSC-7 launched its inaugural MH-60S deployment in support of Operation ENDURING FREEDOM. During this deployment the Dusty Dogs received outstanding news that one of their crews being selected as Naval Helicopter Association (NHA) East Coast deployed Aircrew of the Year who successfully MEDEVACed a civilian merchant from a foreign vessel, flying the patient into Muscat, Oman. Following deployment, HSC-7 helped to develop the launch and recovery procedures for the LAU-61A/C rocket pod system into and out of Naval Station Norfolk. From July 2013 to April 2014, HSC-7 launched its inaugural MH-60S deployment in support of Operation ENDURING FREEDOM. During this deployment the Dusty Dogs received outstanding news that one of their crews being selected as Naval Helicopter Association (NHA) East Coast deployed Aircrew of the Year who successfully MEDEVACed a civilian merchant from a foreign vessel, flying the patient into Muscat, Oman. Following deployment, HSC-7 helped to develop the launch and recovery procedures for the LAU-61A/C rocket pod system into and out of Naval Station Norfolk.
     
2015 into 2016 was another year filled with workups for the next upcoming deployment. From June 2016 to December 2016 HSC-7 deployed aboard USS Dwight D. Eisenhower in support of Operation INHERENT RESOLVE. Over 2,800 flight hours were flown on deployment with a detachment aboard , transferring more than three and a half million pounds of cargo. From August to November of 2017, the Dusty Dogs flew over 235 flight hours during their Defense Support to Civil Authority (DSCA) operations following Hurricanes Harvey, Irma, and Maria in Texas and Puerto Rico. During the relief operations, over 200 sorties were flown accounting for the transportation of 1,
566 passengers,  of cargo, and 850 flying hours.

See also

 History of the United States Navy
 List of United States Navy aircraft squadrons

References

External links
 HSC-7 official website

Helicopter anti-submarine squadrons of the United States Navy
Military units and formations in Florida